The International Opium Commission was a meeting convened on February 1 to February 26, 1909 in Shanghai that represented one of the first steps toward international drug prohibition. Dr. Hamilton Wright and Episcopal Bishop Charles Henry Brent headed the U.S. delegation. Brent was elected president of the commission.

According to Release, "The formal designation of the meeting as 'commission' reflects the fact that the United States had been unsuccessful in its attempts to convene a 'conference': this latter status would have conferred upon the meeting the power to draft regulations to which signatory states would be bound by international law". The commission was only authorized to make recommendations.

According to Paul S. Reinsch, the commission made these suggestions in its final resolution:It is the duty of all countries to adopt reasonable measures to prevent the departure of shipments of opium to any country which prohibits its entry; that drastic measures should be taken by each government in its own territories to control the manufacture, sale, and distribution of the drug; that all governments possessing settlements in China shall take effective action toward the closing of opium divans in the said settlements.The meeting united the attending nations behind the cause of opium prohibition, leading to the 1912 International Opium Convention.

See also
 Hampden Coit DuBose American missionary founder of the Anti-Opium League in China

References
UK Drugs and UK Drug Laws: 1900-1939.

References

Drug policy organizations
Drug control treaties
1909 in China
1909 in law
1909 in international relations
20th-century diplomatic conferences
Diplomatic conferences in China
History of Shanghai